The St. Andrew's Society of Charleston, South Carolina is located in Charleston, South Carolina and was founded by gentlemen Scottish immigrants to the American South in 1729.  It is a charitable organization that gives assistance to orphans, widows, and others in the Charleston area.  Its members are mostly of Scottish heritage and are upper class philanthropists. The St. Andrew's Society of Charleston is the oldest Scottish society of its type in the world.

References

See also
St. Andrew's Hall, Charleston

Charities based in South Carolina
1729 establishments in the Thirteen Colonies
Organizations based in Charleston, South Carolina
Scottish-American culture in South Carolina
18th-century in Charleston, South Carolina